() is a small chain of hot dog stands located in Reykjavík, Iceland.

History 

The chain has been in continuous operation since 1937 when the first stand was set up on Austurstræti street at the very centre of the city by the grandfather of the current owner, Guðrún Kristmundsdóttir.

In August 2004, the stand was visited by former United States president Bill Clinton while he was visiting Iceland for a UNICEF conference. This celebrity appearance led to a boost in popularity for the stand as it began appearing in tourism guidebooks on Iceland. Two years later in August 2006, the British newspaper The Guardian selected  as the best hot dog stand in Europe.

Today, the chain is popular with both tourists and locals. There are three additional locations in the city, which together sell over one thousand hot dogs on a busy day.

 sells hot dogs that are lamb-based with pork and beef. They are served in a bun with a choice of condiments: ketchup, sweet mustard, remoulade, crisp fried onion and raw onion. Customers who want everything often use the Icelandic phrase "".

, a hot dog costs 600 krónur (€4,2).

Visitors
A number of celebrity patrons have visited the stand. In 2004, Former US president Bill Clinton ordered a hot dog with nothing but mustard. At the time it was considered an odd request, so much so that it is still referenced.

Other famous visitors include Metallica frontman James Hetfield, actor Charlie Sheen, and reality star Kim Kardashian. The main stand also appeared in the first season of Anthony Bourdain's travel program No Reservations. South Korean idols Go Won and Olivia Hye from the girl group Loona have visited the shop.

Author and YouTube personality John Green reviewed the stand in an episode of his podcast The Anthropocene Reviewed, as well as the book adaptation, having visited in 2008.

References

External links

Hot dog restaurants
Icelandic cuisine
Restaurants established in 1937